Mir Hashem (also Romanized as Mīr Hāshem; also known as Ebrāhīmābād and Mīr Hāshim) is a village in Zardeyn Rural District, Nir District, Taft County, Yazd Province, Iran. At the 2006 census, its population was 133, in 53 families.

References 

Populated places in Taft County